Mário Fernando Ribeiro Pacheco Nobre (22 September 1925 – 17 October 2018) was a Portuguese footballer who played as a forward.

External links 
 
 
 Mário Fernando Ribeiro Pacheco Nobre

1925 births
2018 deaths
Portuguese footballers
Association football forwards
Primeira Liga players
Associação Académica de Coimbra – O.A.F. players
Portugal international footballers